Gelephu (Wylie: dge-legs-phu), also spelled as Gelyephug, Gelegphu, Gaylegphug or Gaylephug,  is a town or Thromde in Sarpang District in Bhutan. It is located on the Indian border, about 30 km to the east of Sarpang, the Dzongkhag (District) headquarters,  and has a population of 9,858 as per the 2017 census. It is one of the road entry points into Bhutan from India: Phuntsholing to its west and Samdrup Jongkhar to its east are two other road entry points into Bhutan.

History
History of Gelephu dates back to 1960s when primitive settlement was shifted from the banks of Maw Chhu to the present area, which used to be known as Hati Sahar (Elephant infested place).

On 5 September 2005, armed insurgents bombed a marketplace in the town, killing two people and injuring twenty-seven others.

Planning area
Gelephu Thromde has 11.52 km2 planning boundary area which can be increased further. It has 6 sub zones (Demkhong) listed as 1. Trashiling, 2. Namkhaling, 3. Jampeling, 4. Rabtengling, 5. Samdrupling, 6. Sonam Gatsel. Core market area is very close to the Indo-Bhutan border. Ashish Kumar Chauhan is also one of the Urban Planner while delineating the boundaries of Industrial Area Plan and  Local Area Plan 4 & 5.
Gelephu is located at about 30 km to the east of Sarpang, the Dzongkhag Headquarters. Though, Sarpang is the administrative centre for the Dzongkhag, Gelephu, due to various factors, has prospered and developed as a market town serving the hinterland.

The Sarpang-Gelephu Zone offers unique opportunities for Bhutan, as well as for the citizens within the services catchment area. The geographical setting of the town with relatively flat terrain, close proximity and well established connectivity with India, and its location as a nodal connection for the central parts of Bhutan, makes the place one of the preferred locations for future development.

The structure plan for Gelephu lays down the precinct plan, road network, open space system and amenities system. It reviews the existing scenario of Gelephu and the potentials and constraints from which future possibilities emerge. It explains the proposals for action from which the Structure Plan of Gelephu will be composed. These are then illustrated through maps and diagrams. It also includes implementation and management strategies, investment plan and development control regulations for coherent growth of the town. The Development Control Regulations have been included as a part of the Structure Plan to support the proposals of the plan through the introduction of regulations and procedures. The jurisdiction of these regulations includes the area under the Gelephu Thromde, including Urban Control Zone. Gelephu is envisioned as a Growth Center for south-central Bhutan serving a series of smaller settlements, or Service Centers, like Sarpang, Damphu, Zhemgang etc.

The Structure Plan envisions an impressive entrance or a ‘Gate way’ into Gelephu through a portal from India. It is proposed to be a multi-modal terminal heading Trongsa in North, Sarpang and Damphu to West, and proposed Sipsoo-Daipham National Highway towards East.
The proposed Sarpang – Gelephu development corridor will serve as the backbone for a Special Economic Zone. It proposes the establishment of Dry Port and a Free Trade Zone as a part of the Special Economic Zone.

Another theme of the Gelephu Plan is to develop inter-linked open-green spaces for use as recreation, sports, walking, cycling, exercising and play gardens that can provide an excellent opportunity to promote planned growth of Gelephu unlike many other settlements.

Urban recreational park
One of the main themes of Gelephu urban development is to interlink open-green spaces for use as recreation, sports, walking, cycling, exercising and play gardens. Open space systems have become an integral part of town planning as a result of the intense demand for outdoor recreation and a growing concern for conservation. Open spaces have a crucial role in the urban life, since they act as breathing spaces in the dense urban fabric, or a place of recreation and retreat for the urban population.
Location: Samdrupling Demkhong adjacent to Royal Boulevard Road (NH-4)
Area: 60 Acres
Existing Plantation: Teak
Proposed Plantation: Evergreen trees with existing teak
Proposed Activity: Recreational Park

Proposed Park 

The vegetation for Gelephu region could be classified as tropical forest with some broadleaf evergreen vegetation. Having the intense rainfall, the region is dominated by hard wood trees and cash crops like areca nut (Domashing). The thick teak vegetation along the Gelephu-Trongsa Highway located near Sheittikhare Chhu provides a prime scope for conservation and economic generation if developed through an integrated approach.

Trade and commerce

Location of Gelephu is quite favorable for cross-border trade between India and Bhutan. Indo-Bhutan Royal entrance gate is opening a vast opportunity for the business and development between the two countries. From that Indo-Bhutan border gate Bongaigaon, the sixth largest city of Assam, emerging as business node for the economics affairs i.e. business dealing & logistic supports is 78 km away.

Airport
(for a complete entry, see Gelephu Airport)
An Airport in Gelephu was initially planned in the early 2000s.  The plan faced major obstacles in construction, including a lack of willing contractors to bid on the project. Work finally began in July 2011, with a completion date set for the end of April 2012. Gelephu's runway was inaugurated by Prime Minister Jigme Thinley on 25 October 2012 but has yet to become certified for operation. There are currently no buildings at the airport and it is accessed by a gravel road.

Army Welfare Project (AWP)
Bhutan's modern liquor industry was established in 1976 with the AWP as the only distillery manufacturing high quality potable liquor in Bhutan. AWP is a company incorporated under the Companies Act of the Kingdom of Bhutan mainly in the business of bottling a range of alcoholic beverages such as whisky, rum, gin, and many more drinks. 
The AWP is constantly growing its portfolio of brands from blended whiskies to brandy and white spirits to cater the needs of a wide variety of customers particularly in the huge Indian market and to expand its market base internationally. AWP has its Head Office in Phuentsholing, Bhutan.

The AWP has strong presence with more than 18 well-established brands in the liquor market. The main strengths of AWP today lies in its in-house technical expertise (blend development) and good quality natural spring water which is a key input in the production of liquor products. AWP's commitment to environment protection, Bhutan's green credentials and its ambience for maturing high quality spirits are some of the strengths for developing premium brands in the region and achieve organic growth in this category. Presently AWP Gelephu has around 18.44 acre area which include the water treatment plant and manufacturing unit and a guest house. Building AWP brand portfolio in emerging markets and divesting in non-alcoholic products are key strategic objectives.

Services
Construction Development Corporation Limited is a Public Sector Company with 100% shares owned by the Royal Government of Bhutan. After the merger of Gelephu workshop to Hesothangkha in 1996-1997 and till recently, maintenance of its huge workshop structure and compound was neglected and it did not receive that much importance and priority to maintaining operation in the south. The facilities and workshop structure/buildings are currently in a dilapidated condition except for the Lungta Auto Center, which provides comprehensive auto services. After the revival, initiatives have been taken up to repair and rehabilitate the workshop buildings/facilities gradually in a phased manner to curtail loss and avoid the need for a huge investment. It caters to 3 Field Division i.e. Sarpang, Phuentsholing and Zhemgang Field Division. Jurisdiction wise, it covers the far-flung central region of Panbang, Dagana and Zhemgang. Two field workshops located at Sarpang and Mangdechu provide field support services.

Hotels
Hotel Khamsang, Hotel Tshenden, Tropical, Chorten and Kuky are the few hotels cum bar in Gelephu. Apart from these there are many Indian hotels like Hotel Ashoka, Prasad & Laxhmi.

References

External links
Gelephu Structural Plan

External links 

Populated places in Bhutan
Bhutan–India border crossings
Sarpang District